Svetlana Mircheva (Bulgarian: Светлана Мирчева) (born 1976) is a Bulgarian artist, who was nominated for a 2010 Baza Award by the Institute of Contemporary Art, Sofia. In 2012, she displayed her artwork titled Images of the Word at the Un Cabinet D'Amateur art gallery in Sofia, Bulgaria.

Life and work
Svetlana Mircheva was born in Kazanlak, Bulgaria. She studied at National Academy of Arts and completed her MA in industrial design, Multimedia class in 2000.

Her solo exhibitions are Random show at Vaska Emanouilova Gallery, branch of Sofia City Gallery, Sofia (2011), Possible exhibitions at Nurture Art Gallery, New York (2012), 103 Mistakes at Un Cabinet D'Amateur Gallery, Sofia (2012), Images of the word at Un Cabinet D'Amateur Gallery, Sofia (2014). 

She is one of the artists of Un Cabinet D'Amateur Gallery, Sofia, founded by Olivier Boissiere.

References

1976 births
Living people
20th-century women artists
Bulgarian artists